Ansor Mukhamaddovudovich Khabibov (born 20 July 2003) is a Russian football player of Tajik origin who plays for FC Arsenal Tula.

Club career
Khabibov made his debut in the Russian Premier League for FC Arsenal Tula on 6 March 2022 in a game against PFC Krylia Sovetov Samara.

Career statistics

References

External links
 
 
 

2003 births
People from Districts of Republican Subordination
Russian people of Tajikistani descent
Tajikistani emigrants to Russia
Living people
Russian footballers
Association football midfielders
FC Arsenal Tula players
Russian Second League players
Russian Premier League players
Russian First League players